Muzafer Ejupi (born 16 September 1988) is a retired Macedonian footballer. He last played in Croatia for Slaven Belupo.

Club career
Ejupi started his career at FK Vardar, where he remained until 2010 when he joined Metalurg Skopje.

At the beginning of 2012 he moved to Turkey, joining Kartalspor, but left in May of the same year, not earning a single cap for the team.

That summer Ejupi joined FK Shkëndija, and proved to be in good scoring form, ending up as the number two scorer of the Macedonian First Football League, second only to Jovan Kostovski. He remained in form the following season, scoring 15 goals, trailing only behind Dejan Blaževski with 19 and Borče Manevski with 17.

In the summer of 2014 he moved abroad again, joining the Thai team Songkhla United F.C. for a half-year spell.

At the end of the year Ejupi joined Croatia's NK Slaven Belupo, where he became team's top scorer in the season 2015–16. After the successful season, he decided to move to NK Osijek. Ejupi enjoys another fruitful season, leading the scorers list after 24 rounds of the 2016-17 Croatian First Football League.

On 11 June 2019, Ejupi returned to the Croatia's NK Slaven Belupo. He signed one-year contract with an option for one more year.

In December 2019, a statement was released by Ejupi on the Slaven Belupo website which announced his retirement. The player stated that he was "tired physically and mentally".

International career 
He made his senior debut for Macedonia in a December 2012 match against Poland and has earned a total of 2 caps, scoring no goals. His second and final international was a March 2017 friendly match against Belarus.

Personal life
On 25 September 2019, Ejupi was brought to a local police station following a brawl in Koprivnica. It was subsequently reported by the Croatian media that he was the victim of an assault.

References

External links
 

1988 births
Living people
Footballers from Skopje
Albanian footballers from North Macedonia
Association football forwards
Macedonian footballers
North Macedonia under-21 international footballers
North Macedonia international footballers
FK Vardar players
FK Metalurg Skopje players
KF Shkëndija players
FK Horizont Turnovo players
Muzafer Ejupi
NK Slaven Belupo players
NK Osijek players
Macedonian First Football League players
Muzafer Ejupi
Croatian Football League players
Macedonian expatriate footballers
Expatriate footballers in Thailand
Macedonian expatriate sportspeople in Thailand
Expatriate footballers in Croatia
Macedonian expatriate sportspeople in Croatia